Li Zongren or Li Tsung-jen (13 August 1890 – 30 January 1969), courtesy name Telin (Te-lin), was a prominent Guangxi warlord and Kuomintang (KMT) military commander during the Northern Expedition, Second Sino-Japanese War and Chinese Civil War. He served as vice-president and acting President of the Republic of China under the 1947 Constitution.

Biography

Early life

Li Zongren was born in Xixiang Village (西鄉村), near Guilin in Guangxi Province, the second eldest in a Han family of five boys and three girls. His father, Li Peiying (李培英), was a village schoolmaster. After a patchy education Li enrolled in a provincial military school. He joined the Tongmenghui, the revolutionary party of Sun Yat-sen, in 1910 but had little understanding at that time of Sun's wider goals of reform and national reunification. Li's native province of Guangxi was also the home province of Taiping Gen. Li Xiucheng, to whom Li's family claimed to be related.

Early military service
Schooled under Cai E, Li graduated from the Guilin Military Cadre Training School and in 1916 became a platoon commander in the army of Guangxi warlord Lu Rongting. Li's direct superior was Lin Hu. Lu, the governor of Guangxi, was a former bandit who had ambitions to expand into neighboring provinces, especially Guangdong. For the next few years the warlords of Guangxi and Guangdong were involved in mutually destructive battles, and both occupied portions of each other's territory at various times. Lu and his closest associates were collectively known as the Old Guangxi Clique. During a battle with a rival warlord in Hunan in 1918, Li's bravery earned him a promotion to battalion commander.

In 1921 Li Zongren accompanied Lin Hu and Lu Rongting in Lu's second invasion of Guangdong, attacking forces under the command of Chen Jiongming. When Lu's invasion suffered a disastrous defeat, Li led the rear guard when the Old Guangxi Clique forces retreated. Most of Lin Hu's officers were former bandits and militia recruited earlier by Lin from the Zhuang areas of Guangdong. During the campaign many of Lin's officers defected to the Guangdong forces, taking their units with them. In the face of defeat Li Zongren's battalion shrunk to about 1000 men and "sank into the grasses" in order to escape.

Rise to power
After Lu's defeat, most of his army dissolved into independent bands of soldiers, many of whom resorted to banditry in order to survive. Foreign missionaries and aid workers active in Guangxi at this time reported that banditry in Guangxi was extremely common and severe, with bandits commonly looting all food and valuables from undefended villages and resorting to murder and public cannibalism in order to extort ransoms from the relatives of people they kidnapped. Li, intending to become more than a bandit, began building a personal military force of professional soldiers that became the equal of any group of bandits or Zhuang irregulars that Lu Rongting drew on in his war to re-establish his power in Guangxi. Li joined Sun Yat-sen's Kuomintang after Sun established a base in Guangdong.

As chaos became the norm in Guangxi, Li became the independent commander of an area several counties large on the Guangdong border, and was joined by his old friend and colleague Huang Shaoxiong. The administration of Li and Huang was credited with keeping the area they controlled relatively free of the bandits and petty battles that plagued Guangxi at the time. In 1924, while Lu was besieged by rebels in Guilin, Li and his colleagues peacefully occupied the provincial capital, Nanning. Lu then fled and took refuge in French Indochina. The next month Sun Yat-sen, from his base of operations in Guangdong, recognized Li Zongren and his allies Huang Shaoxing and Bai Chongxi as the rulers of Guangxi. Together they became known as the New Guangxi Clique.

Kuomintang general

Li reorganized his forces as the "Guangxi Pacification Army". He was named the Commander in Chief, Huang Shaohong the deputy Commander and Bai Chongxi the Chief of Staff. By August they had driven all other contenders out of the province. Li Zongren was military governor of Guangxi from 1924 to 1925 and from 1925 to 1949 Guangxi remained under his influence.

In 1926 Li allowed his soldiers to enroll in Kuomintang armies, but kept personal control of his troops. A Soviet adviser was sent to Guangxi, and Li's forces were renamed the Seventh Army Corps. Li went on to be a commanding general in the Northern Expedition, during which he was appointed commander of the 4th Army Group, composed of the Guangxi Army and other provincial forces amounting to 16 corps and six independent divisions.

Li's first victories as a Nationalist general were in Hunan, where he defeated rival warlord Wu Peifu in two successive battles and captured the provincial capital, Wuhan, in 1926. After these victories Li became a famous and popular general within the KMT, and his army became variously known as the "Flying Army" and the "Army of Steel". When Wang Jingwei installed a left-leaning KMT faction in Wuhan, Borodin attempted to recruit Li to join the Communists, but Li was loyal to Chiang Kai-shek and refused. Against the advice of his Soviet advisors, Li then marched up the north side of the Yangze to attack the forces of warlord Sun Chuanfang. Sun was the leader of the "League of Five Provinces" (Zhejiang, Fujian, Jiangsu, Anhui and Jiangxi), and successfully halted Chiang's advance into his territory in Jiangxi. Li went on to defeat Sun in three successive battles, securing his territories for the KMT.

By the time Li Zongren defeated Sun Chanfang, he had gained a reputation as being strongly opposed to communism and highly suspicious of the Comintern in China, and his army was one of the few KMT detachments free from serious Communist influence. After being assured of his support, Chiang had Li's units redeployed to the new capital of Nanjing. He then used Li's Guangxi armies to purge his own First Division of Communists. In the resulting White Terror, thousands of suspected Communists were summarily executed. Li's close subordinate, Bai Chongxi, was notable for his important role in this purge.

In April 1928 Li, with Bai Chongxi, led the Fourth Army group in an advance on Beijing, capturing Handan, Baoding and Shijiazhuang by June 1. Zhang Zuolin withdrew from Beijing on June 3, and Li's army seized the city and Tianjin. After the fall of Wang Jingwei's government in Wuhan and the expulsion of all Soviet advisors from KMT-held territories, Li was put in charge of one of five KMT political councils set up to administer KMT-controlled territories, based in Wuhan. In January 1929 he dismissed Nanjing's appointee to the Hunan provincial committee and, fearing retribution, uncharacteristically fled to the foreign concessions in Shanghai. Chiang then arranged for Li and his two closest subordinates to be stripped of their posts within the government and expelled from the Party for life.

Return to Guangxi
After his falling out with Chiang Kai-shek, Li Zongren returned to Guangxi and devoted himself to that province's internal administration, with some success. In 1929 he supported Shanxi warlord Yan Xishan in his attempt to form an alternative central government based in Beijing, leading to the Central Plains War. Li led troops to reconquer Hunan as far north as Yueyang, before Chiang's decisive defeat of Yan and his ally, Feng Yuxiang, forced Li to withdraw back to Guangxi.

Following Yan's defeat in the Central Plains War, Li allied with Chen Jitang after Chen became the chairman of the government of Guangdong in 1931, and prepared to battle Chiang Kai-shek. Another civil war would have broken out if Japan had not invaded Manchuria, prompting Li and Chiang to end their hostilities and unite against the Empire of Japan.

Second Sino-Japanese War

In 1937 full-scale war between Japan and China broke out, beginning the Second Sino-Japanese War (1937–45). Chiang Kai-shek attempted to make use of Li's military experience by promoting him to be the director of the KMT Fifth War Zone. Li's first action against the Japanese came in the 1938 Battle of Taierzhuang, after the Communist Zhou Enlai (who was aiding the Nationalists as part of the United Front) recognized Li as the most capable Nationalist general available and used his influence to have Li appointed overall commander, despite Chiang's reservations about Li's loyalty.

Under Li's command the defense of Tai'erzhuang was a major victory for the Chinese, killing 20,000–30,000 Japanese soldiers and capturing a large amount of supplies and equipment. The victory was principally credited to Li's planning and use of tactics, luring the Japanese into a trap and then annihilating them. The battle of Taierzhuang was one of the first major Chinese victories in the war against Japan, proving that with good weapons and inspired leadership Chinese armies could hold their own. Li also participated in the Battle of Xuzhou, Battle of Wuhan, Battle of Suixian-Zaoyang, 1939–40 Winter Offensive, Battle of Zaoyang-Yichang, Central Hopei Operation, and Battle of South Henan.

From 1943 to 1945 Li was made Director of the Generalissimo's Headquarters. This was a virtual and unwanted retirement from active command after his earlier successes. Li spent the last years of the war grumbling about his enforced inactivity.

Chinese Civil War

After the war, Li was given the post of Director of the Peiping Field Headquarters from 1945 to 1947. This was a post without effective power, and he was sidelined from command in the early part of the Chinese Civil War.

On 28 April 1948 Li was elected by the National Assembly as the vice-president, five days after his political opponent Chiang Kai-shek became the president (Chiang had opposed Li's appointment, supporting Sun Fo's candidacy instead). Chiang resigned the next year, on 21 January 1949, as a response to several serious Chinese Communist victories in northern China, and Li became the acting president the next day.

After the resignation of Chiang from the presidency, Mao Zedong momentarily halted attacks against Kuomintang territories, attempting to negotiate a KMT surrender. Mao's Eight Points, the conditions that he demanded for an end to the civil war, were:

 Punish all war criminals (Chiang Kai-shek was considered "number one")
 Abolish the invalid 1947 constitution;
 Abolish the KMT legal system;
 Reorganize the Nationalist armies;
 Confiscate all bureaucratic capital;
 Reform the land-tenure system;
 Abolish all treasonous treaties; and,
 Convene a full Political Consultative Conference to form a democratic coalition government.

Recognizing that agreeing to these points would effectively surrender control of China to the CPC, Li attempted to negotiate milder conditions that might have led to an end to the civil war, but in vain. In April 1949, when the Communists recognized that Li was unlikely to accept their conditions, they offered Li an ultimatum to accept within five days. When he refused, the Communists resumed their campaign.

Li's attempts to negotiate with the Communists were interpreted by some in the KMT as "pacifist attacks", and increased tensions between Li and Chiang (whose relationship was already strained). Li attempted to negotiate a settlement with the Communists based on the implementation of Li's Seven Great Peace Policies. The policies that Li wanted to carry out were:

 "Bandit pacification commands" (剿總) to be controlled by military officers
 Overly strict orders are to be more lenient
 Eliminate anti-communist special commando units (戡亂建國總隊)
 Release political prisoners
 Allow press freedom
 Eliminate unusual cruelty in punishment
 Eliminate arrest of civilians without proper reasons

Li's attempts to carry out his policies faced varying degrees of opposition from Chiang's supporters, and were generally unsuccessful. Chiang especially antagonized Li by taking possession of (and moving to Taiwan) US$200 million of gold and US dollars belonging to the central government that Li desperately needed to cover the government's soaring expenses. When the Communists captured the Nationalist capital of Nanjing in April 1949, Li refused to accompany the central government as it fled to Guangdong, instead expressing his dissatisfaction with Chiang by retiring to Guangxi.

Former warlord Yan Xishan, who had fled to Nanking only one month before, quickly inserted himself into the rivalry, attempting to have Li and Chiang reconcile their differences in the effort to resist the Communists. At Chiang's request Yan visited Li in order to convince Li not to withdraw from public life. Yan broke down in tears while talking of the loss of his home province of Shanxi to the Communists, and warned Li that the Nationalist cause was doomed unless Li went to Guangdong. Li agreed to return under the condition that Chiang surrender most of the gold and US dollars in his possession that belonged to the central government, and that Chiang stop overriding Li's authority. After Yan communicated these demands and Chiang agreed to comply with them, Li departed for Guangdong.

In Guangdong, Li attempted to create a new government composed of both Chiang supporters and those opposed to Chiang. Li's first choice of premier was Chu Cheng, a veteran member of the Kuomintang who had been virtually driven into exile due to his strong opposition to Chiang.  After the Legislative Yuan rejected Chu, Li was obliged to choose Yan Xishan instead. By this time Yan was well known for his adaptability, and Chiang welcomed his appointment.

Conflict between Chiang and Li persisted. Although he had agreed to do so as a prerequisite of Li's return, Chiang refused to surrender more than a fraction of the wealth that he had sent to Taiwan. Without being backed by gold or foreign currency, the money issued by Li and Yan quickly declined in value until it became virtually worthless.

Although he did not hold a formal executive position in the government, Chiang continued to issue orders to the army, and many officers continued to obey Chiang rather than Li.  The inability of Li to coordinate KMT military forces led him to put into effect a plan of defense that he had contemplated as early as 1948. Instead of attempting to defend all of southern China, Li ordered what remained of the Nationalist armies to withdraw to Guangxi and Guangdong, hoping that he could concentrate all available defenses on this smaller, and more easily defensible, area. The object of this strategy was to maintain a foothold on the Chinese mainland in the hope that the United States would eventually be compelled to enter the war in China on the Nationalist side.

Chiang opposed Li's plan of defense because it would have placed most of the troops still loyal to Chiang under the control of Li and Chiang's other opponents in the central government. To overcome Chiang's intransigence Li began ousting Chiang's supporters within the central government. Yan Xishan continued in his attempts to work with both sides, creating the impression among Li's supporters that he was a "stooge" of Chiang, while those who supported Chiang began to bitterly resent Yan for his willingness to work with Li. Because of the rivalry between Chiang and Li, Chiang refused to allow Nationalist troops loyal to him to aid in the defense of Guangxi and Guangdong, with the result that Communist forces occupied Guangdong in October 1949.

Exile
After Guangdong fell to the Communists, Chiang relocated the government to Chongqing, while Li effectively surrendered his powers and flew to New York City for treatment of his chronic duodenum illness at the Hospital of Columbia University. Li visited the President of the United States, Harry S. Truman, and denounced Chiang as a "dictator" and an "usurper." Li vowed that he would "return to crush" Chiang's movements once he returned to China.

The Kuomintang defenses continued to fall apart. General Hu Zongnan ignored Li's orders, and the Muslim General Ma Hongkui was furious at this. Ma Hongkui sent a telegram to Li to submit his resignation from all positions he held, then Ma Hongkui fled to Taiwan, and his cousin Ma Hongbin took charge of his positions.

In November 1949, Chongqing fell too, and Chiang relocated his government to Chengdu but subsequently moved to Taipei in December 1949, but he did not formally re-assume the presidency until March 1, 1950. In January 1952, Chiang commanded the Control Yuan, now in Taiwan, to impeach Li in the "Case of Li Zongren's Failure to carry out Duties due to Illegal Conduct" (李宗仁違法失職案), and officially relieved  Li of the position as vice-president in the National Assembly on 10 March 1954.

Return to mainland China

Li remained in exile until July 20, 1965, when he caused a sensation by returning to Communist-held China with the support of Zhou Enlai. Li's return to China was used as propaganda by the Communist government to encourage other KMT members to return to the mainland, regardless of their politics. Li died of duodenal cancer in Beijing at 78, in the darkest period of the Cultural Revolution.

Li's residence in mainland China is viewed by some Chinese Communists as Li's "patriotic return to the embrace of his Motherland with smiles", something similar to the former Qing Emperor Puyi's "reformation".

Personal life
During the course of his career Li gained a reputation as an ardent militarist and confirmed anti-intellectual, but with a rugged sense of integrity. He was known for disliking music.  Like many Chinese leaders in the 1930s, Li was once an admirer of European Fascism, seeing it as a solution to the problems of a once proud nation humbled by internal dissension and external weakness. His ethical attitudes were self-consciously drawn from Confucianism. After his falling out with Chiang Kai-shek in 1929, Li often expressed himself in terms of frustrated patriotism.  Li was an admirer of the British historian Edward Gibbon and his monumental historical work, The Decline and Fall of the Roman Empire.

Li and his close staff member, the Muslim General Bai Chongxi, were powerful partners in politics and military affairs. They were once given the nickname Li Bai (李白), after the famous poet.

Li was married to Li Xiuwen (李秀文) at 20 in an arranged marriage, but they separated soon afterwards. Li Zongren and Li Xiuwen had a son, Li Youlin (李幼鄰). In 1924, Li married Guo Dejie (郭德潔), who died of breast cancer soon after returning with Li to Beijing. Li and Guo had one son: Li Zhisheng (李志聖). Li then remarried, to Hu Yousong (胡友松), who was 48 years younger than Li, and the daughter of actress Hu Die. Hu changed her name to Wang Xi (王曦) after Li died, and remarried.

Li Zongren's nephew Alan Lee (李倫) runs a Kung Fu school in New York City since 1967. A set of Samurai swords and dagger of the Edo period given to Li Zongren as a "gift of truce between enemies who are now friends" by either Seishirō Itagaki or Rensuke Isogai were passed on to Alan Lee as part of the family legacy.

Li co-wrote Memoirs of Li Zongren with historian Tong Tekong. Li's memoir is notable for its vehement criticism of Chiang Kai-shek and its analysis of Japan's strategic failure to conquer China. A more detailed account of Li's life is depicted in the less popular biography My Trusted Aide (Wode Gugong), written by Li's distant relative Namgo Chai.

See also
 Second Sino-Japanese War
 National Revolutionary Army
 Military of the Republic of China
 History of the Republic of China
 He was portrayed by Wang Xueqi in the 2009 movie The Founding of a Republic.

Footnotes

Sources

 Barnouin, Barbara and Yu Changgen. Zhou Enlai: A Political Life. Hong Kong: Chinese University of Hong Kong, 2006. .  Retrieved at <Zhou Enlai: A Political Life> on March 12, 2011.
 Bonavia, David.  China's Warlords.  New York: Oxford University Press.  1995.  
 Gillin, Donald G. "Portrait of a Warlord: Yen Hsi-shan in Shansi Province, 1911-1930." The Journal of Asian Studies. Vol. 19, No. 3, May, 1960. Retrieved at: <The Journal of Asian Studies, Vol. 19, No. 3 (May, 1960), pp. 289-306> on February 23, 2011
 Gillin, Donald G.  Warlord: Yen Hsi-shan in Shansi Province 1911-1949.  Princeton, New Jersey: Princeton University Press.  1967.
 Li Zongren, Li Tsung-jen, Tong Te-kong. The memoirs of Li Tsung-jen. Boulder, Colo.: Westview Press. 1979. .
 Spence, Jonathan D. The Search for Modern China, W.W. Norton and Company. 1999. .
 "CHINA: Return of the Gimo".  TIME Magazine. Monday, Mar. 13, 1950. Retrieved at <CHINA: Return of the Gimo - TIME> on May 16, 2011.
 Jeffrey G. Barlow,  THE ZHUANG:  ETHNOGENESIS, December 12, 2005 COPYRIGHT, JEFFREY G. BARLOW, Department of History, Pacific University, 2043 College Way, Forest Grove, Oregon, 97116, EMAIL  barlowj@pacificu.edu
 Chapter 19: The Zhuang and the 1911 Revolution
 Chapter 20: The Zhuang and the Development of the Modern Economy in Guangxi

External links

 
 Li Zongren papers at the Rare Book and Manuscript Library, Columbia University, New York, NY

1890 births
1969 deaths
Chinese military personnel of World War II
National Revolutionary Army generals from Guangxi
People from Guilin
Presidents of the Republic of China
Vice presidents of the Republic of China
Republic of China warlords from Guangxi
Taiwanese defectors
Tongmenghui members
Members of the Kuomintang
Chinese socialists
Chinese anti-capitalists
Chinese anti-communists
Chinese Civil War refugees
Republic of China people who surrendered to the Chinese Communist Party
People of the Northern Expedition
People of the Central Plains War
Burials at Babaoshan Revolutionary Cemetery